Ras El Aioun (Arabic:رأس العيون, Algerian Arabic pronunciation: راس لعيون Ras Layoun, French: Ras El Aïoun) is a town in northeastern Algeria, within the Ras El Aioun District.

References

Communes of Batna Province
Cities in Algeria
Algeria